The Hamburg Commercial Historic District of Hamburg, Arkansas, encompasses the historic heart of the town.  It is centered on the Town Square, where the Ashley County Courthouse stood until it was demolished in the 1960s, and includes a two-block area surrounding the square.  Most of the buildings (out of 24 in the district) are brick buildings that were built before 1920.  The square is now a grassy park with a gazebo.

The district was listed on the National Register of Historic Places in 2009.

See also
National Register of Historic Places listings in Ashley County, Arkansas

References

Historic districts on the National Register of Historic Places in Arkansas
Neoclassical architecture in Arkansas
Buildings designated early commercial in the National Register of Historic Places
Buildings and structures completed in 1937
Geography of Ashley County, Arkansas
National Register of Historic Places in Ashley County, Arkansas
Commercial Historic District